KZIA, known as "Z 102.9", is a radio station based in Cedar Rapids, Iowa. It has a Top 40 (CHR) format entirely staffed with local personalities, including morning DJs Eric Hanson, Clare, and Destiny, known as “The Morning Scramble.” The station's transmitter is located in Hiawatha, Iowa, and its signal reaches most of eastern Iowa, including Cedar Rapids, Iowa City, Waterloo, and the Quad Cities area. It also reaches Prairie du Chien, and Platteville, both in Wisconsin.

History
KZIA was originally known as KQCR, which had a Top 40/CHR format as "Q103" for many years, and was the dominant CHR station back then. In 1994, Rob Norton Jr. and Eliot Keller, owners of KRNA, purchased KQCR to create the Cedar Rapids market's first radio duopoly. On September 5, 1995, KQCR changed its format to country music and its call letters to KXMX, "Max 102.9". The country format lasted almost three years until Norton and Keller agreed to sell KRNA and KXMX to Texas-based Capstar Broadcasting. While the KRNA sale was successful, Capstar terminated the agreement to buy KXMX. Norton and Keller kept the station, changing the format to top 40 and the call letters to KZIA on June 12, 1998. Today KZIA is the only locally owned commercial FM station in the Cedar Rapids market, as most FMs in the area are owned by either Clear Channel Communications or Townsquare Media.

On October 31, 2006, KZIA acquired the former KCRG radio (1600 AM) from Gazette Communications. KZIA renamed the station KGYM and moved its studios from downtown Cedar Rapids to the KZIA studios on the city's southwest side.

Smart FM
The station airs an All-80s hits format on KZIA-HD2 titled "Smart FM.” Originally named "ROBfm" after Norton, and airing an adult hits/classic rock format, it was renamed to "Smart FM" after Norton's death on January 29, 2018 at the age of 69. On August 8, 2020, KZIA-HD2 shifted to all-80s hits, while retaining the "Smart FM" branding. KZIA-HD2 is also relayed over FM radio through FM translator stations 95.1 K236AA in Cedar Rapids, and 98.5 K253BE in Iowa City. Despite each frequency limited to a low power of 250 watts, the use of two translators allows coverage for both Linn and Johnson counties. The station can also be heard throughout other counties in eastern Iowa via the primary 102.9-HD2 signal through an HD Radio receiver.

"Smart FM" features Greg Runyon on middays. Runyon was previously with Z102.9.

HD Radio digital channels
On May 14, 2003, KZIA became the first Iowa radio station to broadcast in HD Radio.

KZIA also airs two channels of sports programming on their HD Radio signal. Originally, there was one channel of sports programming on HD3, which was just a simulcast of sister station KGYM, but now is split into two channels on the HD3 and HD4 sub-channels. KZIA-HD3 feeds Iowa City translator K292FZ (106.3 FM), and KZIA-HD4 fed Cedar Rapids translator K298BM (107.5 FM). This allowed up to three different sports programs at once (you may hear a Cedar Rapids High School sports game on 107.5, with one from Iowa City on 106.3, and a game that is the most anticipated for both areas on the main 1600 station). To designate different frequencies, 106.3 is known as the "South Gym", 107.5 was the "North Gym", and 1600 is the "Main Gym".

In January 2020, KGYM began simulcasting on translator K272GB (102.3 FM) in Cedar Rapids, and began redirecting listeners to the new frequency. The following month, K298BM/KZIA-HD4 split from the KGYM simulcast and began airing a separate sports talk format as "Gym OT." The schedule consisted of hot talk/male-oriented talk shows and sports betting shows, along with ESPN Radio and SportsMap Radio programming. On January 1, 2022, K298BM/KZIA-HD4 flipped to alternative rock as "X107.5."

The station's HD signal is multiplexed:

References

External links
KZIA website
KZIA Livestream

ZIA
Mass media in Cedar Rapids, Iowa
Contemporary hit radio stations in the United States